Pimelea ciliolaris is a species of flowering plant in the family Thymelaeaceae and is endemic to a restricted area of New South Wales. It is a stunted shrub with narrowly elliptic leaves and heads of densely hairy, cream-coloured to pale yellow flowers.

Description
Flowering occurs from October to December.

Taxonomy
This pimelea was first formally described in 1983 by S. Threlfall who gave it the name Pimelea octophylla subsp. ciliolaris in the journal Brunonia from specimens collected in the Warrumbungle Ranges in 1899. In 1990, Barbara Lynette Rye raised the subspecies to species status as Pimelea ciliolaris in the Flora of Australia.

Distribution and habitat
Pimelea ciliolaris grows in exposed, rocky places in the Warrumbungles in northern New South Wales.

References

ciliolaris
Malvales of Australia
Plants described in 1983
Flora of New South Wales